Charles Findlay McCully (April 30, 1947 – October 23, 2007) was a soccer player who played as a forward.  He spent two seasons in the American Soccer League, one in the German American Soccer League and five in the North American Soccer League. An emigrant from Scotland, he also earned eleven caps with the U.S. national team between 1973 and 1975.

Professional career
Born in Motherwell, Scotland, McCully relocated to the United States and initially played two seasons in the American Soccer League. In 1968, he signed with the Boston Beacons of the North American Soccer League (NASL). The Beacons folded at the end of the season and McCully moved to the German American Soccer League for the next two seasons. In 1971, the expansion New York Cosmos signed McCully. He played twenty-four games, scoring six goals in 1971. The next season, he played in only seven games and scored no goals before leaving the NASL. In 1975, he returned to the NASL with the Hartford Bicentennials. In 1976, Hartford traded him to the Washington Diplomats. He retired at the end of the season.

McCully was regarded as someone with a nose for the goal, and a player with eyes in the back of his head (he was extremely aware of every man's position on the pitch). He was also regarded as a great teacher of the game, who always had time to talk and mentor the younger players, and was a very giving person.

National team
As a naturalized citizen, McCully earned eleven caps with the U.S. national team between 1973 and 1975. His first game with the national team came in a 1–0 win over Poland on August 12, 1973. His last game was a 2–0 loss to Mexico on August 25, 1975 in the Mexico Cup in which he played alongside his brother Henry McCully, who gained both of his two caps at the tournament.

In 1999, McCully was inducted into the Connecticut Soccer Hall of Fame as an inaugural member.

See also
List of Scottish football families
List of United States men's international soccer players born outside the United States

References

External links
 
 History of sports in Connecticut (archived)
 Hall of Fame eligibility bio (archived)
 Memorial site

Footballers from Motherwell
1947 births
2007 deaths
Scottish footballers
American soccer players
American Soccer League (1933–1983) players
Boston Beacons players
Connecticut Wildcats players
German-American Soccer League players
Connecticut Bicentennials players
North American Soccer League (1968–1984) players
North American Soccer League (1968–1984) indoor players
New York Cosmos players
Washington Diplomats (NASL) players
Scottish emigrants to the United States
United States men's international soccer players
Stirling Albion F.C. players
Scottish Football League players
Philadelphia Ukrainian Nationals players
Cambuslang Rangers F.C. players
Scottish Junior Football Association players
Association football forwards